Ngara Girls' High School is a girls' secondary boarding school in Nairobi, Kenya.

History and operations
It opened in January 1957 as a mixed-sex secondary school for Indian-Kenyan students. It served Nairobi neighbourhoods of Ngara and Parklands.

In 1962, male students were transferred out, making the school girls' only; boys who previously attended the school began attending Highway Secondary School in South B, Nairobi.

The school opened to students of all races after 1964, when racial segregation in schooling ended.

In 2004, the school's boarding facilities opened. The funding came from a 1996 Community Development Trust Fund (CDTF) grant.

Notable staff
 Margaret Kobia

See also

 Education in Kenya
 List of boarding schools
 List of schools in Kenya
 Women in Kenya

References

External links
 , the school's official website

1957 establishments in Kenya
Asian-Kenyan culture in Nairobi
Boarding schools in Kenya
Educational institutions established in 1957
Girls' schools in Kenya
Indian-Kenyan culture
Schools in Nairobi
High schools and secondary schools in Kenya